Epicephala orientale is a moth of the family Gracillariidae. It is known from India (West Bengal, Karnataka, Meghalaya).

The larvae feed on Bauhinia species, including Bauhinia purpurea and Bauhinia variegata. They probably mine the leaves of their host plant.

References

Epicephala
Moths of Asia
Moths described in 1856